Chahpingah is a rural locality in the South Burnett Region, Queensland, Australia.

Road infrastructure
The Chinchilla–Wondai Road runs along part of the northern boundary.

References 

South Burnett Region
Localities in Queensland